Bamoro (also spelled Bamora) is a village in central Ivory Coast. It is in the sub-prefecture of Bouaké-SP, Bouaké Department, Gbêkê Region, Vallée du Bandama District.

Bamoro was a commune until March 2012, when it became one of 1126 communes nationwide that were abolished.

Notes

Former communes of Ivory Coast
Populated places in Vallée du Bandama District
Populated places in Gbêkê